Charles Bauwens was a Belgian footballer. He played in six matches for the Belgium national football team from 1910 to 1912.

References

External links
 

Year of birth missing
Year of death missing
Belgian footballers
Belgium international footballers
Place of birth missing
Association football defenders